Gaimdibhla (died 755) was Abbot of Aran.

Gaimdibhla is one of the few attested successors of Enda of Aran. Nothing is known of Gaimdibhla's life or background.

External links
 https://celt.ucc.ie/published/T100005A/text055.html

Rev. Clifford Stevens, The One Year Book of Saints "St. Enda"

8th-century deaths
People from County Galway
8th-century Irish abbots
Year of birth unknown